1985 in professional wrestling describes the year's events in the world of professional wrestling.

List of notable promotions 
These promotions held notable shows in 1985.

Calendar of notable shows

Tournaments and accomplishments

JCP

WWF

Awards and honors
All Japan Women's Pro-Wrestling
AJW Rookie of the Year: Akira Hokuto

Pro Wrestling Illustrated

Wrestling Observer Newsletter

Title changes

WWF

Spinoff media
Hulk Hogan's Rock 'n Wrestling premiered on CBS.Mutharamkunnu P.O., directed by Sibi Malayil and starring Mukesh and Lizy, is released. The film is noted for the special appearance of Indian actor-wrestler Dara Singh as himself.
British wrestler "Mr. TV" Jackie Pallo's autobiography "You Grunt, I'll Groan" is published.
Welsh wrestler-promoter Orig Williams's autobiography "Cario'r Ddraig: Stori El Bandito" is published.The Wrestling Album'' is released by the World Wrestling Federation. It is the first album released by the WWF and featuring mostly theme music of wrestlers on the roster at the time.

Births
January 13 – Luke Robinson
January 17 – Sage Beckett
January 18 - Mark Briscoe 
January 27 – Yuji Hino
February 3 – Angela Fong
February 20 – Killian Dain
February 26 – Pentagón Jr.
March 5 – Martin Casaus
March 13 - Matt Jackson
March 20 - Matt Taven 
March 24 – Lana
April 10 – Yūki Ōno
April 20 – Curt Hawkins
April 29 – Jay Lethal
May 8 – Tommaso Ciampa
May 14 – Zack Ryder
May 16 – Mike Kanellis
May 19 – Aleister Black
May 24 – The Great Naga
May 25 – Roman Reigns
June 6 – Drew McIntyre
June 30 – Cody Rhodes
July 2 - Jessie Belle Smothers 
July 16 - Q. T. Marshall 
July 22 – Akira Tozawa
August 2 – Davey Boy Smith Jr.
August 6 – Tony Nese
August 7 - Jamin Olivencia 
August 12 - Fallah Bahh 
August 14 - Jaysin Strife (died in 2022) 
August 20 – Mikey Nicholls
August 22 – Jimmy Uso
August 22 – Jey Uso
September 19 – Renee Young
September 24 – Shane Haste
September 29 - Candice LeRae 
October 12 - Amy Zidian 
November 25 – Yuki Sato
December 7 – Dean Ambrose/Jon Moxley
December 14 - Katsuya Kitamura (died in 2022) 
December 16 – Psycho Clown
December 21 – Oney Lorcan
December 28 – Taryn Terrell

Debuts
Uncertain debut date
Big Van Vader 
Brittany Brown 
Paul Diamond
Savio Vega
Virgil 
 April 29 - Miguel Pérez Jr.
 July 30 - Miss Elizabeth
 October 31 - Lex Luger
 November 28 – Sting
The Ultimate Warrior 
Jeanne Basone
Lisa Moretti

Retirements
 Jack Brisco (1965-1985)
 Gerald Brisco (1967-1985) (Returned to wrestling in 1998 and retired 2000)
 Cora Combs (1945–1985)
 George Scott (1948–1985)
 Gil Hayes (1966–1985)
 Chief Jay Strongbow  (1955–1985)
 Larry Hennig (1956–1985)
 Wally Karbo (1935–1985)
 Buzz Tyler (1977–1985)
 Pat Patterson (1959-1985) (Returned to wrestling in 1998 and retired 2000)

Deaths
January 12 - Paul Luty, British wrestler (b. 1932) 
January 21 – Eddie Graham, American wrestler and Championship Wrestling from Florida promoter (b. 1930)
March 6: 
Wild Bull Curry, American wrestler (b. 1913)
Bholu Pahalwan, Indian wrestler (b. 1930) 
April 19 - Chabela Romero (b. 1946) 
September 3 – Jay Youngblood, American wrestler (b. 1955)
September 18 – Ed Don George, American wrestler and promoter (b. 1905)
November 1 – Rick McGraw, American WWF wrestler (b. 1955)
December 24 – Pierre "Mad Dog" Lefebvre, Canadian wrestler (b. 1955)
December 24 – Tarzan Tyler, Canadian wrestler and manager (b. 1927)
December 24 - Adrien Debois, Canadian wrestling referee (b. 1950)

References

 
professional wrestling